Juan López de Hoyos (1511–1583) was a Spanish schoolmaster and author who lived during the Renaissance. He is most noted today for having been the only known the teacher of Miguel de Cervantes, whom he calls "my beloved disciple". He also edited the volume in which Cervantes' first published works (poems) appeared, a commemorative work on the life of Philip II of Spain's wife, Elisabeth of Valois.

Works
Declaración de las armas de Madrid y algunas antigüedades
Relación de la muerte y honras fúnebres del SS. Príncipe D. Carlos, hijo de la Mag. del Cathólico Rey D. Philippe el segundo nuestro señor, 1568
Hystoria y relación verdadera de la enfermedad, felicíssimo tránsito y sumptuosas exequias fúnebres de la Sereníssima Reyna de España doña Isabel de Valoys, 1569
Real apparato, y sumptuoso recebimiento con que Madrid ... rescibio a la Sereníssima reyna D Ana de Austria, 1572                                        .

References

Renaissance writers
Spanish Renaissance people
1511 births
1583 deaths
Spanish male writers
16th-century Spanish writers
16th-century male writers